André Schild (1910 – 13 July 1981): born in Fontainemelon or Cernier in the Swiss canton of Neuchâtel. He was a linguist and former administrator of the Universal Esperanto Association (Universala Esperanto Asocio) in Geneva, and the director of the Oficie por li lingue international auxiliari Occidental (Office for the International Auxiliary Language Occidental) in the 1940s in Basel. He taught at the Benedict School (Bénédict-Schule) in Basel. He published the outline of his Neolatino system in 1947.

Involvement with Interlingua
After his involvement with Esperanto and Occidental, Schild later joined the movement for Interlingua and became co-founder of the World Interlingua Union (Union Mundial pro Interlingua) which was founded on 28 July 1955 in Tours, France - he was elected first Secretary General of the WIU (1955–1958). Editor of the first official WIU organ, Circular al cognoscitores e amicos de Interlingua (22 February 1954), Circular al prime membros del UMI (26 May 1954), Lista del membros (August 1954), Bulletin del Union Mundial pro Interlingua (October 1954, January, March and June 1955) and Union Mundial pro Interlingua (UMI) - bulletin publicate per le Secretariato General (August 1955). Language Editor of Le Currero del Mundo (September–December 1955 until August 1957) and of Bulletin de Interlingua (September 1957 until June 1959). He published the manual Interlingua in 20 lectiones in French, Italian and German. He edited almost entirely the whole text of the large German-Interlingua Dictionary. - From the 24–27 July 1971 he attended the 4th International Interlingua Conference in Basel. He has an obituary in Currero nº 66/1981.

References

 http://www.interlingua.com/historia/conferentias/basel-1971-photos.htm
 The Rotarian; An International Magazine - May 1950
 Discussiones de Interlingua by Alexander Gode, p. 72
 R.L. Stevenson: Gulielmo del molino. La planura e las stelas. Traduction per H.Littlewood. 30 pp.

Interlingua
Interlingua speakers
Linguists from Switzerland
Swiss Esperantists
1910 births
1981 deaths
20th-century linguists
Interlingue speakers